Cold Service is the 32nd book in Robert B. Parker's  Spenser series and first published in 2005.

Hawk is injured protecting a bookie, and Spenser helps to rehabilitate him.

References

2005 American novels
Spenser (novel series)
American detective novels